Oncopeltus famelicus is a species of seed bug in the family Lygaeidae, found in sub-Saharan Africa.

Subspecies
These two subspecies belong to the species Oncopeltus famelicus:
 Oncopeltus famelicus famelicus (Fabricius, 1781)
 Oncopeltus famelicus jucundus (Dallas, 1852)

References

External links

 

Lygaeidae